The 1942–43 Národní liga (English: National league) was the fourth season of the Národní liga, the first tier of league football in the Nazi Germany-annexed Protectorate of Bohemia and Moravia which had been part of Czechoslovakia until March 1939.

The Czech championship was won by Slavia Prague, and Josef Bican was the league's top scorer with 39 goals.

Czech clubs in what was now the German-annexed Protectorate of Bohemia and Moravia continued their own league which was variously referred to as the Národní liga (English: National league), Bohemia/Moravia championship or Česko-moravská liga (English: Bohemian-Moravian league) while ethnic-German clubs played in the German Gauliga Sudetenland.

In the Slovak Republic an independent Slovak league, the Slovenská liga, had been established in 1939 and played out its own championship which was won by OAP Bratislava in the 1942–43 season. A national Czechoslovak championship was not played between 1939 and 1945.

Table
For the 1942–43 season SK Nusle and SK Rakovník had been newly promoted to the league.

Results

References

External links
 Czechoslovakia - List of final tables (RSSSF)

Czechoslovak First League seasons
Czechoslovak First League, 1942-43
1942–43 in Czechoslovak football